The sixth season of American talent show competition series America's Got Talent was broadcast on NBC from May 31 to September 14, 2011. No major changes were made in the program's format, although a number of participants who auditioned later dropped out due to obligations outside the competition. However, the season attracted media attention after one of its participants established a world record during their performance on the program.

The sixth season was won by jazz singer Landau Eugene Murphy, Jr., with silhouette dance group Silhouettes finishing in second, and glow-light dance group Team iLuminate placing third. During its broadcast, the season averaged around over 11.8 million viewers, with its opening episode attracting around 15.28 million viewers (the highest viewing figures for a season of America's Got Talent to premiere with).

Season overview 
Auditions for the sixth season's competition took place during Winter until mid-Spring 2011, across eight cities in the United States. Filmed locations included Los Angeles, Atlanta, Houston, Seattle, Minneapolis and New York. Auditions held within Denver and Chicago were not filmed. Due to weather conditions, Piers Morgan was unable to attend some of the auditions held in Minneapolis, though this did not disrupt production. The sixth season had a number of participants who auditioned, but dropped out despite securing a place in the live rounds, after determining that it would conflict with other obligations each had. In an interview held during May 2011 on Late Night with Jimmy Fallon, Howie Mandel described the program as the most dangerous, indicating that ambulances had to be called six times during auditions after a number of participants injured themselves during their act. One of the most significant events of this season involved Darren Taylor, who operated under his stage name of Professor Splash and established a new world record, during one of his live round performances for the highest shallow dive.

Of the participants who auditioned for this season, sixty-one secured a place in the live quarter-finals, with twelve quarter-finalists in each one. Eleven of these acts were given a second chance in the Wildcard quarter-final, after losing their initial quarter-final. About twenty-four of these advanced and were split between the two semi-finals, with ten semi-finalists securing a place in the finals, and four finalists securing a place in the grand-final. The following below lists the results of each participant's overall performance in this season:

 |  |  |  | 
 |  Wildcard Quarter-finalist

  Ages denoted for a participant(s), pertain to their final performance for this season.
  These participants were entered into the Wildcard quarter-final after losing their initial quarter-final.
  The ages of these participants were not disclosed on the program.
  For health and safety reasons, Professor Splash had to perform outside the studio; judges were required view the performance in person, and used hand-carried signs in place of their buzzers.

Quarter-finals summary
 Buzzed Out |  Judges' choice | 
 |

Quarter-final 1 (July 12)
Guest Performers, Results Show: Avril Lavigne, and cast of Priscilla, Queen of the Desert.

  Because of the majority vote for Miami All-Stars, Mandel's voting intention was not revealed.

Quarter-final 2 (July 19)
Guest Performers, Results Show: Hot Chelle Rae, and TRACES

Quarter-final 3 (July 26)
Guest Performers, Results Show: Stevie Nicks, Fighting Gravity, and The Smurfs

Quarter-final 4 (August 2)
Guest performers, Results Show: Maroon 5, and Jason Derülo

Quarter-final 5 - YouTube Round (August 9)
Guest performers, Results Show: OK Go and Pilobolus, Keenan Cahill, Rebecca Black, Tay Zonday, and Up and Over It.

Quarter-final 6 - Wild Card Round (August 16)
Guest Performers, Results Show: Colbie Caillat, and cast of Les Misérables

Semi-finals summary
 Buzzed Out |  Judges' choice | 
 |

Semi-final 1 (August 23)
Guest Performers, Results Show: Demi Lovato, Prince Poppycock, and New Boyz

  Because of the majority vote for West Springfield Dance Team, Osbourne's voting intention was not revealed.

Semi-final 2 (August 30)
Guest Performers, Results Show: David Guetta, Flo Rida, Nicki Minaj, and Susan Boyle

Finals summary
 |  | 
 |  |  Buzzed Out (Top 10 Finals Only)

Final - Top 10 (September 6)
Guest Performers: Michael Grimm (Performance Episode); and Il Divo (Results Show).

Grand-final (September 13)
Guest Performers: Terry Fator (Performance Episode); Def Leppard, OneRepublic, Tony Bennett and Queen Latifah, cast of Cirque du Soleil's Iris, and Jackie Evancho (Results Show).

Ratings
The following ratings are based upon those published by Nielsen Media Research after this season's broadcast:

References

2011 American television seasons
America's Got Talent seasons